Sveta Ana (lit. "Saint Anne") may refer to:

 Sveta Ana pri Ložu, a village in the Municipality of Loška Dolina, southern Slovenia
 Sveta Ana v Slovenskih Goricah, a village in the Municipality of Sveta Ana, northeastern Slovenia
 Municipality of Sveta Ana, a municipality in northeastern Slovenia
 Sveta Ana, Croatia, a village near Đurđevac, Croatia
 Stari Grad, Makole, a village in Slovenia known as Sveta Ana until 1955